Mark Ferguson (born 21 May 1990) is an Irish handballer, currently playing for Lughnasa HC.

Achievements
 Irish Senior League:
 Final 4: 2011–12, 2012–13,
 IOHA Cup:
 Semifinalist:  2012-13

References

External links
EurohandballSite
Olympichandball.org
Scoresway.com
Eurohandball.com
 Eurohandball.com
Eurohandball.com
Eurohandball.com

1990 births
Living people
Irish male handball players